WMWG-LP (89.3 FM) is a non-commercial low-power radio station licensed to Glendale, Wisconsin, serving the Greater Milwaukee area. The station is owned by the Milwaukee Turners organization (of Turner Hall fame).

References

External links

MWG-LP
MWG-LP